Armand Joseph may refer to:

 Armand Joseph (1788–?), Franciscan friar and producer of the earliest known dot distribution map
 Armand Louis Joseph de Fitte de Soucy (1796–1862), French general and governor of Martinique
 Armand Joseph Dubernad, (1741–1799), French merchant
 Armand Joseph Bruat (1796–1855), French admiral
 Armand-Joseph Guffroy (1742–1801), French lawyer and revolutionary
 Armand Joseph Overnay (1798–1869), French Chansoinner
 Armand Joseph Jurion or "Jef" (born 1937), Belgian footballer

See also
 Joseph Armand (1820–1903), Canadian politician